Beach athletics competition at the 2016 Asian Beach Games was held in Danang, Vietnam from 26 to 29 September 2016 at Son Thuy Beach, Danang, Vietnam.

Medalists

Men

Women

Medal table

Results

Men

60 m

Round 1
26 September

Final
27 September

4 × 60 m relay
28 September

Cross-country
29 September

Cross-country team
29 September

Long jump
26 September

Triple jump
29 September

Shot put
27 September

Women

60 m

Round 1
26 September

Final
27 September

4 × 60 m relay
28 September

Cross-country
29 September

 Lu Mengyao was awarded bronze because of no three-medal sweep per country rule.

Cross-country team
29 September

Long jump
26 September

Triple jump
28 September

Shot put
27 September

References

External links 
  (archived)

2016 Asian Beach Games events
Asian Beach